Lepi may refer to:

People
 Lepi Mića, Serbian singer-songwriter

Places
 Lépi, Angola

Other
 Lepi, species in Star Wars